Neon Christ was an American hardcore punk band from Atlanta, Georgia.

History
The band was formed in 1983 by Randy DuTeau (vocals), William DuVall (guitar), Danny Lankford (bass), and Jimmy Demer (drums). For a brief spell in 1985, they added a second guitarist named Shawn Devine. The band recorded and released two EPs, Parental Suppression and The Knife That Cuts So Deep, but only the former was a standalone; the latter was the second disc of a double 7" release that came out in 1990—four years after the band broke up. The song "Ashes to Ashes" was included as the third track on the International P.E.A.C.E. Benefit Compilation, a 1984 double album, released on R Radical Records, featuring 55 hardcore punk acts from around the world. They toured throughout the Atlanta area, playing alongside other notable acts such as Corrosion of Conformity and Dead Kennedys. The band played one final show in February 1986 before going their separate ways for the next two decades.

In early January 2006, Neon Christ reunited for a pair of shows, one in the afternoon at Eyedrum in downtown Atlanta and one in the evening at the Star Bar in Little Five Points.

They reunited again for a one-time show on February 2, 2008 in Lawrenceville, Georgia. The reception that they got inspired them to work with director Edgar Johnson on creating a documentary film called All Alone Together: Neon Christ and Atlanta Hardcore.

William DuVall said of the project:

Discography
Studio EPs
Neon Christ 7" (1984)
Neon Christ 2x7" (1990)

Compilations
1984 (2021)

Videography

References

External links
 Neon Christ on Myspace
 
 All Alone Together: Neon Christ and Atlanta Hardcore

1983 establishments in Georgia (U.S. state)
Hardcore punk groups from Georgia (U.S. state)
Musical groups established in 1983
Musical groups disestablished in 1986
Musical groups from Atlanta
Musical quartets